Bremen Township is one of 29 townships in Cook County, Illinois, USA.  As of the 2010 census, its population was 110,118. It was organized in 1850 and is located southwest of Chicago in southern Cook County.  An administrative office for Bremen Township is located at 16361 South Kedzie Parkway, Markham, Illinois.  It is named after the State of the same name in Germany as this area was settled by primarily German settlers.

Geography

Bremen Township is bordered by Harlem Avenue (Illinois Route 43) on the west, 135th Street on the north, Western Avenue on the east and 183rd Street on the south.

Cities, Towns, Villages
Blue Island (the remaining portion lies in Worth Township)
Country Club Hills (the remaining portion lies in Rich Township)
Crestwood (the remaining portion lies in Worth Township)
Harvey (the extreme western edge of Harvey, the remaining 99% lies in Thornton Township)
Hazel Crest (the remaining portion lies in both Thornton Township and Rich Township)
Homewood (the remaining portion lies in both Thornton Township and Rich Township)
Markham (the remaining portion lies in Thornton Township)
Midlothian
Oak Forest
Orland Park (the extreme eastern edge of Orland Park, the remaining 99% lies in mostly Orland Township with small portions in Palos Township and Frankfort Township)
Posen (the remaining portion lies in Thornton Township)
Robbins (the remaining portion lies in Worth Township)
Tinley Park (which also has a large portion in Orland Township with smaller sections in Rich Township and Frankfort Township, Will County)

Unincorporated Towns
Goeselville at

Adjacent townships
 Worth Township (north)
 Calumet Township (northeast)
 Thornton Township (east)
 Bloom Township (southeast)
 Rich Township (south)
 Frankfort Township, Will County (southwest)
 Orland Township (west)
 Palos Township (northwest)

Cemeteries
The township contains six cemeteries: Bachelor Grove, County, Lewis Memorial Park, Saint Gabriel Catholic, Trinity Evangelical Lutheran and Zion Lutheran.

Major highways
  Interstate 57
  Interstate 80
  Interstate 294
  U.S. Route 6
  Illinois Route 43
  Illinois Route 50

Lakes
 Dolphin Lake
 Twin Lakes (Oak Forest)

Demographics

At the time of the 2010 census, with a population of 110,575 residents, Bremen Township was:
 White: 57.9%
 Black: 32.0%
 American Indian and Alaska Native: 0.2%
 Asian: 1.9%
 Native Hawaiian and Other Pacific Islander: 0.03%
 Some other race: 5.8%
 Two or more races: 2.1%
 Hispanic or Latino (any race): 13.4%

Education
The public high school district for most of Bremen Township is Bremen Community High School District 228 which includes Oak Forest High School, Bremen High School, Tinley Park High School, and Hillcrest High School.

References
 
 United States Census Bureau 2007 TIGER/Line Shapefiles
 United States National Atlas

External links
 Bremen Township official website
 City-Data.com
 Illinois State Archives
 Township Officials of Illinois
 Cook County Official Site

Townships in Cook County, Illinois
Populated places established in 1850
Townships in Illinois